Baby James Harvest is the fourth album by English progressive rock band Barclay James Harvest, released in 1972.

Track listing

Side one
"Crazy Over (You)" (Les Holroyd) – 4:17
"Delph Town Morn" (John Lees) – 4:48
"Summer Soldier" (Lees) – 10:28

Side two
 "Thank You" (Lees) – 4:24
"One Hundred Thousand Smiles Out" (Holroyd) – 6:05
"Moonwater" (Woolly Wolstenholme) – 7:30

Bonus tracks
The album was remastered and reissued by Harvest in 2002 with bonus tracks:
 "Child of Man" (single B-side) (Lees) – 3:21
"I'm Over You" (single A-side) (Lees) – 3:53
"When The City Sleeps" (single B-side)† (Lester Forest) – 4:16
"Breathless" (single A-side)† (Terry Bull) – 3:09
"Thank You" (alternative version)▲ (Lees) – 4:27
"Medicine Man" (single version) (Lees) – 4:29
"Rock and Roll Woman" (Holroyd) – 3:18
"The Joker" (Holroyd/Lees) – 3:32
"Child of Man" (BBC session 15 March 1972)▲ (Lees) – 3:37
"Moonwater" (2002 remix) (Wolstenholme) – 7:20
† originally released under the pseudonym "Bombadil"
▲ previously unreleased

Personnel
John Lees – vocals, guitars, sound effects
Les Holroyd – vocals, bass, piano, organ, mellotron, acoustic guitar
Stuart "Woolly" Wolstenholme – piano, organ, mellotron, vocals, bells, tam-tam
Mel Pritchard – drums, percussion

References

External links

1972 albums
Barclay James Harvest albums
Harvest Records albums